"Just Because" is a song by American R&B singer Ginuwine. It was co-written by Greg Lawson and Damon Sharpe and recorded for his third studio album The Life (2001). Production on the track was helmed by Ric Wake, with additional production by Richie Jones. The song was released as the album's second international single in August 2001. "Just Because" reached the top 20 of the New Zealand Singles Chart.

Background
"Just Because" was written by Ginuwine along with Greg Lawson and Damon Sharpe, while production was overseen by Ric Wake. Lawson and Richie Jones were also credited as additional producers. In a 2016 interview, Ginuwine commented on the song: "I hate that song. My label made me do that. There were deals made and I was like 'I’ll do it.' I had to do a video for it too. Have you seen the video? They were trying to make me Pop. Now I see what they were trying to do. Back in the day, I was like 'I want to do this!.' It’s alright though."

Track listing

Notes
 denotes additional producer

Credits and personnel
Credits lifted from the liner notes of The Life.

Ginuwine – vocals, writer
Richie Jones – additional production
Greg Lawson – additional production, writer
Damon Sharpe – writer
Ric Wake – producer

Charts

References

2001 singles
Ginuwine songs
Songs written by Ginuwine
Songs written by Damon Sharpe
Song recordings produced by Ric Wake
Epic Records singles
2001 songs